H. Bronnley & Co. (or Bronnley) is a British soap and toiletries producer established in 1884 in London. The company moved to Brackley, Northamptonshire before 1961 and was located in the old Chesham and Brackley Brewery premises, with their box making department located across the road in an old manor house. Following closure of its factory, the company relocated its head office to Milton Keynes in 2013.

History 
It was founded in 1884 by James Bronnley when he was just 19 years. He had spent 1883 in Paris studying the science of soap making and had decided to return to England to become a high quality soap maker.

Starting in a shed in Holborn, London, the quality of his soaps soon led to an expansion. First to larger premises in Islington and then to a larger plant in Acton, London. The company stayed in Acton until a large fire in 1949. The company relocated to Brackley, Northamptonshire, where the present factory was built and opened in 1989.

The company remained in family control for three generations until 2007 when it was subject to a management buy-in for around £10million. Chairman Ann Rossiter retired as part of the deal, with the new management team led by former Lornamead chief executive, Leslie Barber and Scott Dougan from Revlon.

In November 2011 the company went into administration  and was bought out by shareholders. The company subsequently announced that manufacturing would be outsourced in the future.

Bronnley today is one of the leading British soap and toiletries brands. It is a British Royal Warrant holder by appointment to Queen Elizabeth II, and is also used by the Prince of Wales.

References

External links 
 Homepage of H. Bronnley & Co.

Companies based in Milton Keynes
British Royal Warrant holders
Personal care companies